The 1991 Maryland Terrapins football team represented the University of Maryland in the 1991 NCAA Division I-A football season. In their fifth and final season under head coach Joe Krivak, the Terrapins compiled a 2–9 record, finished in sixth place in the Atlantic Coast Conference, and were outscored by their opponents 302 to 138. The team's statistical leaders included Jim Sandwisch with 1,499 passing yards, Mark Mason with 452 rushing yards, and Frank Wycheck with 438 receiving yards.

Schedule

Roster

References

Maryland
Maryland Terrapins football seasons
Maryland Terrapins football